Carey Means (born December 4, 1966) is an American voice and stage actor best known for playing Frylock on the Adult Swim show Aqua Teen Hunger Force, and Thundercleese on The Brak Show. He has also performed in several theatrical musicals and plays, including South Pacific, Two Trains Running, A Soldier's Play, and Waiting for Godot. He provided the voice of Jonah Bishop on the Nickelodeon series Welcome to the Wayne.

Personal life
Means is a graduate of Lincoln University in Jefferson City, Missouri with a degree for B.S. Fine Arts/Vocal Music.

He is trained in many dialects, Australian, British, German, Italian,  Celtic, Jamaican, Hispanic, South African, South Mississippian, New York, Asian, French, and West Indian Ocean.

He currently lives in Atlanta, Georgia with his wife Leah Means.

On March 31, 2022, Means' wife announced that he had been hospitalized with congestive heart failure.

Filmography

Theater work
South Pacific: Henry/Sailor
Two Trains Running: Memphis
A Soldier's Play: Sgt. Waters
Jubilee: Chorus
Talk Radio: Sid/Callers
Ceremonies in Old Dark Men: Blue
Waiting for Godot: Pozzo

References

External links
 
Carey Means official fans FaceBook site
Carey Means personal Facebook page
Carey Means official InstaGram site

1966 births
Living people
African-American male actors
American male stage actors
American male video game actors
American male voice actors
Lincoln University (Missouri) alumni
Place of birth missing (living people)
21st-century African-American people
20th-century African-American people